Wedding Day was one of the earliest Australian television series. It aired from 1956 to 1957 on HSV-7 at 9:30pm for a total of 39 weeks, and is notable as it was produced by Crawford Productions. It was a game show, in which the contestants were a couple who had just got married. The archival status of the series is not confirmed.

See also
 The Pressure Pak Show
 Give it a Go
 The Dulux Show

References

External links
 

1956 Australian television series debuts
1957 Australian television series endings
1950s Australian game shows
Black-and-white Australian television shows
English-language television shows
Australian live television series
Seven Network original programming
Television series by Crawford Productions